Ivan Yankouski is a Belarusian freestyle wrestler.  He is a silver medalist at the World Wrestling Championships and a three-time medalist at the European Wrestling Championships.

Career 

In 2016, he won the silver medal in the men's 97 kg event at the 2016 European Wrestling Championships held in Riga, Latvia.

In 2018, he won the silver medal in the men's 92 kg event at the 2018 World Wrestling Championships held in Budapest, Hungary.

Achievements

References

External links 
 

Living people
Year of birth missing (living people)
Place of birth missing (living people)
Belarusian male sport wrestlers
World Wrestling Championships medalists
European Wrestling Championships medalists
Sportspeople from Minsk
21st-century Belarusian people